René Borjas (23 December 1897 – 16 December 1931) was a Uruguayan footballer who played as a forward. He was member of Uruguay national team which won gold medal at 1928 Olympics.

Career statistics

International

References

External links

profile
Biography

1897 births
1931 deaths
Uruguayan footballers
Footballers at the 1928 Summer Olympics
Olympic footballers of Uruguay
Olympic gold medalists for Uruguay
Uruguay international footballers
Uruguayan Primera División players
Montevideo Wanderers F.C. players
Club Nacional de Football players
Olympic medalists in football
Copa América-winning players
Medalists at the 1928 Summer Olympics
Association football forwards